Michael Poliza (born January 1, 1958) is a German photographer and entrepreneur specializing in wildlife and nature photography.

Early life 
Michael Poliza grew up in Hamburg, Germany. A prominent child actor, he appeared in over 100 television shows and films, including Tadellöser & Wolff (1975), Hänsel und Gretel (1971) and Unsere heile Welt (1972) while continuing his schooling. At the age of 17, he left Germany for the USA as an exchange student, where he studied Computer Sciences.

Entrepreneurship

1980s 
At the age of 23, Poliza founded his first IT company, importing IBM computers to Germany. Three years later, Poliza claims he had already earned his first million dollars as he expanded his business in the IT sector.

1990s 
In 1997 he sold his IT companies, invested in stock, and began focusing on digital media. When the dot.com crash happened, Poliza lost much of his fortune. With what was left, he bought the boat 'Starship' in 1998. Accompanied by journalists and photographers, he undertook the 'Starship Voyage'  to document the state of the world’s wild locations at the turn of the millennium.  The book of the voyage, containing 50% pictures taken by him, became a bestseller.

2000s 
Returning to Hamburg in June 2001, Poliza sold the Starship to the US actor Gene Hackman. Between 2002 and 2009, Poliza lived in Cape Town, South Africa, focusing his attention on photographing in the game reserves and nature parks of Southern Africa. The book AFRICA  was launched in 2006, followed by the book  EYES OVER AFRICA  in 2007. Poliza moved back to Hamburg in 2009, published the book ANTARCTIC, opened a gallery and was named ambassador of the World Wildlife Fund (WWF).

2010s 
The books South Africa and Classic Africa were published in 2010, KENYA in 2011. Parallel to his photography, Poliza launched a tailored-tour company, Michael Poliza Experiences.

Books 
 "Die Reise der 'Starship', In 1000 Tagen um die Welt". Frederking & Thaler, 2001, 
 "AFRICA". teNeues Publishing Group, June 2006, 
 "The Essential Africa: The best images from the book AFRICA". teNeues Publishing Group, March 2007, 
 "Eyes Over Africa". teNeues Publishing Group, September 2007, 
 "ANTARCTIC - Life in the Polar Regions". teNeues Publishing Group, August 2009, 
 "SOUTH AFRICA". teNeues Publishing Group, April 2010, 
 "CLASSIC AFRICA". teNeues Publishing Group, September 2010, 
 "KENYA". teNeues Publishing Group, October 2011,

References

External links 
 Michael Poliza Official Website
 http://www.spiegel.de/spiegel/print/d-13514560.html
 https://www.nytimes.com/2006/12/03/books/review/Cowles-africa.html?_r=1&
 http://www.abendblatt.de/reise/article2315299/Ein-Weltenbummler-der-Hamburg-seinen-Heimathafen-nennt.html
 http://www.ms-starship.com/star.htm
 http://4-seasons.de/magazinartikel/naturfotograf-michael-poliza-regeln-muss-man-auch-mal-brechen
 http://www.stern.de/reise/fernreisen/arktis-und-antarktis-von-pol-zu-pol-1503477.html
 http://www.wwf.de/lebendige-natur-im-fokus/

1958 births
Nature photographers
Photographers from Hamburg
Living people